Fatima Zahra Mansouri (born 3 January 1976) is a Moroccan lawyer and politician of the Authenticity and Modernity Party (PAM), and currently the mayor of Marrakesh as well as the Minister of National Planning, Urban Planning, Housing and Urban Policy.

Background
Fatima Zahra Mansouri was born in 1976 into a family of dignitaries from the Rhamna (region of Benguerir-Kelaa des Sraghna). Her maternal uncle is Colonel Abdallah Mansouri, and she is the grand daughter of Ahmed Mansouri who helped Caid Ayadi, an ally of France and Pasha Thami El Glaoui against Moroccans resisting colonisation. She is also the daughter of Abderrahman Mansouri, who was pasha (deputy governor) of Marrakech for eight years and the ambassador of Morocco to the United Arab Emirates. Additionally, she is a relative of the founder of the Authenticity and Modernity Party, the king's friend, Fouad Ali El Himma, being the cousin of his brother-in-law.

She was educated in French schools in Marrakesh. She studied law in France, influenced by her father from a young age, watching his arguments in court. Mansouri started her career as a lawyer, founding a law firm that specializes in commercial and real estate transactions. She served as a municipal counselor for the Authenticity and Modernity Party (PAM).

Political career

Election as mayor
In Morocco Mayors are chosen among city council elected members who elect one of theirs into that position.  Fatima Zahra Mansouri won a seat in the city council in contested elections in 2009, after which she was selected for the position of mayor. Leaked US diplomatic cables reported that the palace pressured parties into electing members of the king's friend party, the party also invoked their closeness to the king to achieve that goal. The cable leak added the mayor selection process in Morocco is normally marred in bribes. She was elected mayor of the city under the aegis of the Authenticity and Modernity Party (PAM) on 22 June 2009, defeating her rival, Omar Jazouli, the outgoing mayor of the Constitutional Union party, by 54 votes to 35. The 75-year-old Jazouli may have been tainted by a "mini-scandal" in mid-May caused by a prostitute's allegations about his private life. Jazouli have also suffered a campaign of defamation in the press, which launched a number of rumours about him, such as accusing him of being a homosexual.

The next month, in July 2009, a tribunal court annulled Mansouri's election upon evidence of fraud presented by competing parties. After the Front of Democratic Forces (FDF) filed a complaint, the court found that ballots had been issued early and some voting records had been destroyed.  The PAM called for a 48-hour strike to protest the decision. Amidst the pressure of the Arab spring, Mansouri resigned the mayorship on 7 July 2011, but later retracted that decision. Thami Khyari of the FDF said the complaint was against the electoral process, not against Fatima Zahra Mansouri herself. Mansouri challenged the verdict.  In September 2009 the Administrative Court of Appeal of Marrakesh annulled the earlier court decision and declared that the election was valid. The judge who first invalidated the election, Jaafar Hassoun, was later sacked and excluded from the judiciary. Furthermore, a decision by Mohamed Naciri the designated lawyer of the Moroccan royal family, who then was minister of justice, banned Mr. Hassoun from even practising as a lawyer. Some observers commented that this was an example of Fouad Ali El Himma "imposing his wills on the judiciary".

Incumbent parties accused the authorities of actively promoting PAM in the 2009 elections, and criticized Mansouri for her lack of experience in politics. Mansouri's father died on the evening of the election. After taking up the post she announced, "I want to rule by example" and transferred her salary of 5,500 dirhams (480 euros) to cover the expenses of the municipal officials.

Administration
A January 2010 profile in Jeune Afrique said that Mansouri had adopted a transparent, participatory approach, holding meetings with the citizens every week. She had vowed to eradicate poverty and attend to the woes of 20,000 households who have no access to drinking water or electricity. She also intended to readdress the tourism policy, based more on the tourism and hotel industry than on how to assist the poor. She announced that within six months of the start of her mayorship, revenues of the city had increased by almost a third.

On 7 July 2011 it was reported that Mansouri had turned in her resignation to the city council.  It was speculated that the cause was pressure from her deputy Hamid Nargis to accept his decisions.
Mansouri had also threatened to leave PAM, apparently due to an internal struggle over authority within the party.
Also, some of the reforms she had made to the city organization and hiring practices may have offended vested interests.
The news caused a stir, but Mansouri was back at her office on the next day. It was reported that she had received guarantees of non-interference in exchange for agreeing not to resign.

In April 2012, Mansouri lashed out in an open letter against statements made by Mustapha Ramid, Minister of Justice and Liberties. He had been critical of tourism and tourists in Marrakesh. Mansouri said that given his position, his remarks had been irresponsible, had defamed the city and its inhabitants, and had violated the principle of tolerance.

Re-election 
Following her party's success in the general elections of September 2021, Mansouri was re-elected as the mayor of Marrakesh. She was later appointed as minister of housing in the new government of Aziz Akhannouch.

Prize

Mansouri was named by the American magazin forbes in 2014 as one of the 20th most influential women in Africa.

Personal life 
Mansouri is divorced and the mother of two children.

References
Notes

Citations

1976 births
People from Marrakesh
Moroccan women lawyers
Living people
Mayors of places in Morocco
Authenticity and Modernity Party politicians
Women mayors of places in Morocco
21st-century Moroccan women politicians
21st-century Moroccan politicians
20th-century Moroccan lawyers